The Catholic Church in Abkhazia is the third largest Christian denomination in the territory of the Republic of Abkhazia, which is part of the worldwide Catholic Church in communion with the Pope. Most Christians in Abkhazia are Orthodox, see Religion in Abkhazia. Due to Abkhazia's partial recognition, administration of Catholics comes from Catholic dioceses in Russia. 
The Catholic Church in Abkhazia mainly consists of≥ Armenians, Poles, and expatriates living in Abkhazia. The Holy See does not have diplomatic relations with Abkhazia, but has enjoyed two high level visits from the apostolic nuncio.

History

In the 13th and 14th centuries Genoese merchants established their trading enterprises in Abkhazia. With the merchants, came missionaries of various Catholic religious orders.
The presence of the Catholic Church in Abkhazia is closely linked to the history of Catholicism in Georgia. In 1240 Pope Gregory IX sent to the Georgian queen Rusudan missionaries of the monastic order of Franciscans.
In 1328 Pope John XXII established in Tbilisi a Catholic diocese in the territory of which also included Abkhazia. In 1507 Tbilisi Diocese of the Catholic Church was abolished. On 8 November 1632 Catholics living in Abkhazia were annexed to the jurisdiction of the bishop of Isfahan. In the 16th century Armenian Catholics, who were under the care of the Armenian Catholic Church began to settle on the territory of Abkhazia. In 1626, missionaries arrived in Georgia from the Theatine monastic order who stayed here until 1700.
After the annexation of eastern Georgia in 1783 by the Russian Empire Russian government expelled Carmelites, who were in Georgia since 1661. In 1850 Abkhazian Catholics were under the jurisdiction of the Diocese of Tiraspol. In the second half of the 19th century, after the uprisings in Poland, Polish exiles immigrated and founded numerous Catholic communities. In 1908 they built a small Catholic church in honor of St. Simon the Canaanite, which has survived to our time.
After the establishment in Georgia in 1921 the Soviet Abkhazian Catholics were persecuted. Many believers were persecuted. Sukhumi church was closed. It was until 1993 the State Archives.
After the Abkhaz war in 1993 Sukhumi Catholic community because of the inability of service priests from Georgia was transferred to the care of the diocese of Saint Clement in Saratov. Rector of the Catholic parish in the city of Sukhumi was appointed rector of the Sochi arrival of the Apostles Simon and Thaddeus minister Bogdan Severin, who made periodic visits to Sukhumi, the sermons and provide charitable assistance to local Catholics. Catholic services were held at that time in the club Sukhumi Botanical Garden.
In 1996 the church was transferred to the surviving Catholic community. Since that time, it began to make regular worship.

Today

Nowadays the Catholic community of Abkhazia has 150 people (80 people live in Sukhumi). Most of them are Armenians and Poles. There are small groups of Catholics in Gagra and Pitsunda. In Sukhumi are the resident Catholic priest Jerzy Pillas and Catholic Charities' Caritas. After partial recognition of canonical status of Abkhazia, the Catholic community in Sukhumi is not defined. Currently, the Catholic parish in Sukhumi included the Apostolic Administration of the Caucasus.
Abkhazia had twice an official visit of the papal nuncio Claudio Gugerotti in October 2005 and 4 January 2006, who met with the Abkhaz leadership.
In the 2011 decision of the Government of Abkhazia, Catholic community in the name of Saint Simon the Zealot in Sukhumi was transferred to the gratuitous use of the church building, part of a number of historical and cultural heritage of Abkhazia. There are no diplomatic relations between Vatican and Abkhazia.

Notes

References
The Catholic Encyclopedia, Vol 1, ed. Franciscans, M., 2002,

External links
 http://www.kavkaz-uzel.ru/articles/179919/
 http://www.sedmitza.ru/news/337223.html
 https://web.archive.org/web/20160304025759/http://www.abhazia.com/snews.php?action=news&id_cat=1&id_mess=13339

Abkhazia